Nihal Yalçın (born 29 March 1981) is a Turkish actress.

Career 

In 2005 she appeared in the movie Hacivat Karagöz Neden Öldürüldü? as Zeyno Bacı and in 2009 in Ay Lav Yu as Rukiye. She briefly joined Avrupa Yakası as Meryem.

She prepared a segment called "Life Sux" in Okan Bayülgen's Disko Kralı. She had appeared in the role of several fictional characters for Disko Kralı including "Nahide Ekengil": an electronic-pop singer, "Ayla Tanyürek", "Fahriye Soykır": Turkish actress and Şahane Çancı: animal rights activist. 

In 2012 she was cast in one of the prominent roles in Yalan Dünya as Açılay.

Musical career 
She occasionally performs as her fictional characters in the TV series, examples of which include her performance of "Sahibinin Sesi", "Alamazsın Sen Beni" and "Pilates" as Nahide Ekengil. All three songs were written by herself. In 2011 she appeared in Little Caesars commercial where she performed the song "Küçük Sezar" as "Ne'li". Later this song was released as a promotional single. In 2012, she performed "Bir Mumdur" and "Dertler Benim Olsun" covers and "Ne Kadar Güzelsin" in Kurtuluş Son Durak. "Bir Mumdur" and "Dertler Benim Olsun" are well-known songs in Turkey, while "Ne Kadar Güzelsin" is written by herself.

Personal life 
She is of Alevi descent and has 3 sisters and a brother. She graduated from Istanbul University State Conservatory with acting major. Then she made advanced acting masters in Bahçeşehir University.

Filmography

Awards
 19th International Adana Golden Boll Film Festival Best supporting female actress (for Yeraltı and Araf)
 17th Sadri Alışık Awards Best supporting female actress (Comedy) (for Kurtuluş Son Durak)

References

External links 

1981 births
Turkish Alevis
Zaza Alevis
Turkish film actresses
Turkish television actresses
Istanbul University alumni
Bahçeşehir University alumni
Living people
Actresses from Istanbul